Hileithia hohaelis is a moth in the family Crambidae. It was described by Harrison Gray Dyar Jr. in 1914. It is found in Panama.

The wingspan is about 11 mm. The forewings are nearly white with some costal dots.

References

Moths described in 1914
Spilomelinae